Philo Hall (December 31, 1865 – October 7, 1938) was a South Dakota attorney and politician.  He served as Attorney General of South Dakota and a member of the United States House of Representatives.

Early life and American Civil War

Philo Hall was born in Wilton Township, Waseca County, Minnesota on December 31, 1865, the son of Mary E. (Greene) and Philo Hall, a Union Army veteran in the First Minnesota Infantry Regiment, Company G during the American Civil War and direct descendant of Mayflower Compact signatory,  John Alden.  Philo and Mary (née Greene) Hall ran a hotel in Wilton, but the family moved to Brookings, Dakota Territory after the 1883 death of the senior Philo Hall.

The young Philo Hall was educated in Wilton and South Dakota State College. He then studied law under Judge J. O. Andrews, was admitted to the bar in 1887, and practiced in Brookings. He was one of the first members of The United States Congress and South Dakota state government to graduate from a South Dakota educational institution.

Career

In 1890 Hall married Mary A. Cooke, and they were the parents of three children: Vivian (b. 1891); Philo, Jr. (b. 1895); and Morrell (b. 1898).
A Republican, he was the prosecuting attorney for Brookings County from 1892 to 1898, and also served as city attorney for Brookings.  In 1895 he was elected mayor of Brookings, and served one two-year term.

He served in the South Dakota State Senate from 1901 to 1903, and as Attorney General of South Dakota from 1903 through 1907.

In 1906 Hall was elected to Seat A, one of South Dakota's two at-large seats in the U.S. House, and he served one term, March 4, 1907 to March 3, 1909.  He did not win renomination for a second term in 1908, and returned to the practice of the law.

Hall died in Brookings on October 7, 1938.  He was buried at Greenwood Cemetery in Brookings.

References

External links 

1865 births
1938 deaths
American prosecutors
South Dakota State University alumni
People from Waseca County, Minnesota
South Dakota Attorneys General
Republican Party South Dakota state senators
Republican Party members of the United States House of Representatives from South Dakota
People from Brookings, South Dakota